Hawesville is a home rule-class city on the south bank of the Ohio River in Hancock County, Kentucky, in the United States. It is the seat of its county. The population was 945 at the 2010 census. It is included in the Owensboro metropolitan area.

Geography
Hawesville is located in northern Hancock County at  (37.898865, -86.755570), on the south bank of the Ohio River and on the hills that rise south of the river. The Lincoln Trail Bridge carries Kentucky Route 69 across the Ohio at Hawesville, connecting the city with Cannelton, Indiana. U.S. Route 60 passes through the southwest part of Hawesville, leading southeast  to Cloverport and southwest  to Owensboro.

History
Upon the establishment of Hancock County in 1829, local landowner Richard Hawes Sr. (father of Rep. Richard Hawes Jr.) donated land for a county seat, free to any homesteaders who settled there. The Hawesville post office was established later that year. The city was formally established in 1836 and incorporated by the state assembly in 1847.

Despite the Immaculate Conception Church's listing on the National Register of Historic Places, it was demolished and replaced with a modern structure.

Demographics

As of the census of 2000, there were 971 people, 409 households, and 271 families residing in the city. The racial makeup of the city was 98.25% White, 1.44% African American, 0.10% Native American, and 0.21% from two or more races. Hispanic or Latino of any race were 0.21% of the population.

There were 409 households, out of which 34.7% had children under the age of 18 living with them, 51.3% were married couples living together, 12.2% had a female householder with no husband present, and 33.7% were non-families. 32.3% of all households were made up of individuals, and 17.4% had someone living alone who was 65 years of age or older. The average household size was 2.35 and the average family size was 2.98.

In the city, the population was spread out, with 26.6% under the age of 18, 8.4% from 18 to 24, 27.5% from 25 to 44, 22.0% from 45 to 64, and 15.4% who were 65 years of age or older. The median age was 36 years. For every 100 females, there were 88.5 males. For every 100 females age 18 and over, there were 83.3 males.

The median income for a household in the city was $33,929, and the median income for a family was $45,000. Males had a median income of $39,318 versus $22,750 for females. The per capita income for the city was $18,985. About 12.1% of families and 11.9% of the population were below the poverty line, including 12.6% of those under age 18 and 10.1% of those age 65 or over.

Education
Hawesville has a lending library, a branch of the Hancock County Public Library.

See also
 List of cities and towns along the Ohio River

References

Cities in Kentucky
Cities in Hancock County, Kentucky
County seats in Kentucky
Owensboro metropolitan area
Kentucky populated places on the Ohio River